The 2015–16 Melbourne City FC W-League season was the club's inaugural season in the W-League, following the announcement of the team's formation on 13 May 2015. The team is based at the City Football Academy, training on the Academy Pitches at La Trobe University and playing home games at both AAMI Park and CB Smith Reserve.

The club had a remarkably successful season, winning all 12 of its regular season games and achieving success in the 2016 W-League grand final, completing a perfect season, to claim both a maiden regular season premiership and an end of season championship.

Players

Squad information
Correct as of 30 October 2015

Transfers in

Transfers out

Managerial staff

Squad statistics

|-
|colspan="24"|Players no longer at the club:

Competitions

W-League

League table

Results summary

Results by round

Fixtures

Finals series

Non-competitive

Post-season

Fatima Bint Mubarak Ladies Sports Academy Challenge

References

External links
 Official Website

Melbourne City FC (A-League Women) seasons
Melbourne City